The Ammiyya (or ) was a revolt against Ottoman rule in Syria in 1889–1890. The tenant farmers and farmworkers sought to curb the abuses of local sheikhs, restricting them to ⅛ of the communal land. They also wanted to partition the rest of the communal land into individual plots outside the sheikh's control, ending their ability to evict poor farmers.

Druze opposition was led by the Atrash family.

The revolt was largely successful in its aims, restricting the sheikhs to ⅛ of the village land and establishing the system of land tenure which continued in Syria through the Assad regime. Desire to placate the locals also prompted the concessions to French and Belgian companies that led to the DHP, the area's first railway.

See also
 Long Depression, the economic depression at the time which caused falling prices for Hawran wheat
 Abdul Hamid II, the sultan at the time

References

Citations

Bibliography
 .
 .
 .
 .

Rebellions against the Ottoman Empire
Ottoman Syria
Conflicts in 1889
Conflicts in 1890